According to the World Health Organization (WHO), occupational burnout is a syndrome resulting from chronic work-related stress, with symptoms characterized by "feelings of energy depletion or exhaustion; increased mental distance from one’s job, or feelings of negativism or cynicism related to one's job; and reduced professional efficacy". While burnout may influence health and can be a reason for people contacting health services, it is not itself classified by the WHO as a medical condition or mental disorder. WHO additionally states that "Burn-out refers specifically to phenomena in the occupational context and should not be applied to describe experiences in other areas of life."

History 
According to Wolfgang Kaskcha, "Burnout as a phenomenon has probably existed at all times and in all cultures." He notes that the condition is described in the Book of Exodus (18:17–18).

Gordon Parker believes the ancient European concept of acedia refers to burnout, and not depression as many others believe.

It has been suggested that the first printed use of the term "burnout" in English was in one of Shakespeare's sonnets in 1599, referring to a woman's love burning out. The sonnet in question is one of Shakespeare's most famous.

In 1869, New York neurologist George Beard used the term "neurasthenia" to describe a very broad condition caused by the exhaustion of the nervous system, which was thought to be particularly found in "civilized, intellectual communities." The concept soon became popular, and many in the United States believed themselves to have it. Some came to call it "Americanitis". The rest cure was a commonly prescribed treatment (though there were many others). Beard yet further broadened the potential symptoms of neurasthenia over time, so that almost any symptom or behaviour could be deemed to be caused by it. Don R Lipsitt would later wonder if the term "burnout" was similarly too broadly defined to be useful.

In 1961, Graham Greene published the novel A Burnt-Out Case, the story of an architect who became greatly fatigued by his work, and who took much time to recover.

In 1969, HB Bradley used the term "burnout" in a criminology paper to describe the fatigued staff at a centre for treating young adult offenders. This has been cited as the first known academic work to use the term for this concept.

In 1974, Herbert Freudenberger, an American psychologist, used the term in his academic paper "Staff Burn-Out." The paper was based on his qualitative observations of the volunteer staff (including himself) at a free clinic for drug addicts. He characterized burnout by a set of symptoms that includes exhaustion resulting from work's excessive demands as well as physical symptoms such as headaches and sleeplessness, "quickness to anger", and closed thinking. He observed that the burned-out worker "looks, acts, and seems depressed." After the publication of Freudenberger's paper, interest in the concept grew.

In 1976, Christina Maslach noted the term being used by California lawyers working with the poor, and began to study the concept.

In 1981, Maslach and Susan E. Jackson published an instrument for assessing burnout, the Maslach Burnout Inventory (MBI). It was the first such instrument of its kind and the most widely used burnout instrument. The two researchers described burnout in terms of emotional exhaustion, depersonalization (feeling low-empathy towards other people in an occupational setting), and reduced feelings of work-related personal accomplishment.

In 2010, the Swedish Board of Health and Welfare adopted a refined conceptualisation of severe burnout it described as "exhaustion disorder."

In 2015, The World Health Organization adopted a conceptualisation of burnout that is consistent with Maslach's. It adopted a modified version of this in 2022. However, "is not itself classified by the WHO as a medical condition or mental disorder."

Also in 2015, Bianchi and colleagues brought to bear evidence that the construct of burnout substantially overlaps with depression.

As of 2017, nine European countries considered burnout as being a recognised medical disorder.

Diagnosis

Classification 
The two main classification systems of psychological disorders are the Diagnostic and Statistical Manual of Mental Disorders (DSM, used in North America and elsewhere) from the American Psychiatric Association (APA), and the International Classification of Diseases (ICD, used in Europe and elsewhere) from the World Health Organisation (WHO).

Burnout is not recognized as a distinct mental disorder in the DSM-5 (published in 2013). Its definitions for Adjustment Disorders, and Unspecified Trauma- and Stressor-Related Disorder in some cases reflect the condition. 2022's update, the DSM-5-TR, did not add a definition of burnout.

As of 2017, nine European countries considered burnout as being a recognised medical disorder. These countries classify it under one or more codes of the ICD.

The ICD-10 (current 1994–2021) classified "burn-out" as a type of non-medical life-management difficulty under code Z73.0. It was considered to be one of the "factors influencing health status and contact with health services" and "should not be used" for "primary mortality coding". It was also considered one of the "problems related to life-management difficulty". The condition is further defined as being a "state of vital exhaustion," which historically had been called neurasthenia.

The ICD-10 also contained a medical condition category of "F43.8 Other reactions to severe stress."

In 2010 the Swedish Board of Health and Welfare added “exhaustion disorder” (ED; F43.8A) to the Swedish version of the ICD-10, the ICD-10-SE, representing what is typically called "burnout" in English. (See also :sv:Utmattningssyndrom). Swedish sufferers of severe burnout had earlier been treated as having neurasthenia.

The ICD-10-SE defined exhaustion disorder as consisting of:

According to Lindsäter et al., "The diagnosis has become almost as prevalent as major depression in Swedish health care settings, and currently accounts for more instances of long-term sick-leave reimbursement than any other single diagnosis in the country."

The Royal Dutch Medical Association defined "burnout" as a subtype of adjustment disorder as part of the ICD-10 system. In the Netherlands burnout is included in handbooks and medical staff are trained in its diagnosis and treatment. A reform of Dutch health insurance resulted in adjustment disorder treatment being removed from the compulsory basic package in 2012. Practiconers were told that more serious cases of the condition may qualify for classification as depression or anxiety disorder.

A new version of the ICD, ICD-11, was released in June 2018, for first use in January 2022. The new version has an entry coded and titled "QD85 Burn-out". The ICD-11 describes the condition this way:

This condition is classified under "Problems associated with employment or unemployment" in the section on "Factors influencing health status or contact with health services." The section is devoted to reasons other than recognized diseases or health conditions for which people contact health services. In a statement made in May 2019, the WHO said "Burn-out is included in the 11th Revision of the International Classification of Diseases (ICD-11) as an occupational phenomenon. It is not classified as a medical condition."

The ICD's browser and coding tool both attach the term "caregiver burnout" to category "QF27 Difficulty or need for assistance at home and no other household member able to render care." QF27 thus acknowledges that burnout can occur outside the work context.

The ICD-11 also has the medical condition "6B4Y Other specified disorders specifically associated with stress", which is the equivalent of the ICD-10's F43.8.

If, after treatment, a person with burnout continues to have persistent physical symptoms triggered by the condition, in Iceland they may be considered to have "somatic symptom disorder" (DSM-5) and "bodily distress disorder" (ICD-11).

Further detail about the varied ways clinicians and others use ICD and DSM classification with burnout was published by Arno Van Dam in 2021.

The US government's National Institutes of Health includes the condition as "psychological burnout" in its index of the National Library of Medicine, and provides a number of synonyms. It defines the condition as "An excessive reaction to stress caused by one's environment that may be characterized by feelings of emotional and physical exhaustion, coupled with a sense of frustration and failure."

SNOMED CT includes the term "burnout" as a synonym for its defined condition of "Physical AND emotional exhaustion state," which is a subtype of anxiety disorder. The Diseases Database defines the condition as "professional burnout."

Instruments 
In 1981, Maslach and Jackson developed the first widely used instrument for assessing burnout, the Maslach Burnout Inventory (MBI). It remains by far the most commonly used instrument to assess the condition. Consistent with Maslach's conceptualization, the MBI operationalizes burnout as a three-dimensional syndrome consisting of emotional exhaustion, depersonalization (an unfeeling and impersonal response toward recipients of one's service, care, treatment, or instruction), and reduced personal accomplishment.

The MBI originally focused on human service professionals (e.g., teachers, social workers). Since that time, the MBI has been used for a wider variety of workers (e.g., healthcare workers). The instrument or its variants are now employed with job incumbents working in many other occupations.

There are other conceptualizations of burnout that differ from that suggested by Maslach and adopted by the WHO.

In 1999, Demerouti and Bakker, with their Oldenburg Burnout Inventory (OLBI), conceptualized burnout in terms of exhaustion and disengagement, linking it to the job demands-resources model. This instrument is used mainly in the United States.

Also that year, Wilmar Schaufeli and Arnold Bakker released the Utrecht Work Engagement Scale (UWES). It uses a similar conceptualisation to the MBI. However the UWES measures vigour, dedication and absorption; positive counterparts to the values measured by the MBI. It is used mainly in Germany.

In 2005, TS Kristensen et al. released the public domain Copenhagen Burnout Inventory (CBI). They argued that the definition of burnout should be limited to fatigue and exhaustion. The CBI has had some use in Germany.

In 2006, Shirom and Melamed with their Shirom-Melamed Burnout Measure (SMBM) conceptualized burnout in terms of physical exhaustion, cognitive weariness, and emotional exhaustion. An examination of the SMBM's emotional exhaustion subscale, however, indicates that the subscale more clearly embodies Maslach's concept of depersonalization than her concept of emotional exhaustion. This measure has seen little use.

In 2010, researchers from Mayo Clinic used portions of the MBI, along with other comprehensive assessments, to develop the Well-Being Index, a nine-item self-assessment tool designed to measure burnout and other dimensions of distress in healthcare workers specifically. It has been mainly used in the United States.

In 2014, Aniella Besèr et al. developed the Karolinska Exhaustion Disorder Scale (KEDS), which is used mainly in Sweden. It was designed to measure the symptoms defined by the ICD-10-SE's category for exhaustion disorder. The authors believed that those with the disorder were often initially depressed, but that this soon passed. The core symptoms of the disorder were deemed to be "exhaustion, cognitive problems, sleep disturbance". The authors also believed that the condition was clearly differentiated from both depression and anxiety.

In 2020, the Occupational Depression Inventory (ODI), was developed to quantify the severity of work-attributed depressive symptoms and establish provisional diagnoses of job-ascribed depression. The ODI covers nine symptoms, including exhaustion (burnout’s putative core). The instrument exhibits robust psychometric properties. The ODI is the only instrument that assesses work-related suicidal thoughts, a particularly important symptom calling for immediate attention. Available evidence indicates that burnout scales have very high correlations with the ODI, correlations that cannot be explained by item overlap, suggesting that the ODI is a suitable replacement for burnout scales like the MBI.

In 2021, the Sydney Burnout Measure (SBM) was released by Gordon Parker et al., which "captures domains of exhaustion, cognitive impairment, loss of empathy, withdrawal and insularity, and impaired work performance, as well as several anxiety, depression and irritability symptoms."

There are still other conceptualizations as well that are embodied in other instruments, including the Hamburg Burnout Inventory, and Malach-Pines's Burnout Measure.

Kristensen et al. and Malach-Pines (who also published as Pines) advanced the view that burnout can also occur in connection to life outside of work. For example, Malach-Pines developed a burnout measure keyed the role of spouse.

The core of all of these conceptualizations, including that of Freudenberger, is exhaustion.

Maslach advanced the idea that burnout should not be viewed as a depressive condition. Recent evidence, based on factor-analytic and meta-analytic findings, calls into question this supposition. Burnout is also now often seen as involving the full array of depressive symptoms (e.g., low mood, cognitive alterations, sleep disturbance).

Marked differences among researchers' conceptualizations of what constitutes burnout have underlined the need for a consensus definition.

Subtypes 
In 1991, Barry A. Farber in his research on teachers proposed that there are three types of burnout:
 "wearout" and "brown-out," where someone gives up having had too much stress and/or too little reward
 "classic/frenetic burnout," where someone works harder and harder, trying to resolve the stressful situation and/or seek suitable reward for their work
 "underchallenged burnout," where someone has low stress, but the work is unrewarding.

Farber found evidence that the most idealistic teachers who enter the profession are the most likely to suffer burnout.

Caregiver burnout

Burnout affects caregivers.

Relationship with other conditions 
A growing body of evidence suggests that burnout is etiologically, clinically, and nosologically similar to depression. In a study that directly compared depressive symptoms in burned out workers and clinically depressed patients, no diagnostically significant differences were found between the two groups; burned out workers reported as many depressive symptoms as clinically depressed patients. Moreover, a study by Bianchi, Schonfeld, and Laurent (2014) showed that about 90% of workers with very high scores on the MBI meet diagnostic criteria for depression. The view that burnout is a form of depression has found support in several recent studies. Some authors have recommended that the nosological concept of burnout be revised or even abandoned entirely given that it is not a distinct disorder and that there is no agreement on burnout's diagnostic criteria. A newer generation of studies indicates that burnout, particularly its exhaustion dimension, problematically overlaps with depression; these studies have relied on more sophisticated statistical techniques, for example, exploratory structural equation modeling (ESEM) bifactor analysis, than earlier studies of the topic. The advantage of ESEM bifactor analysis, which combines the best features of exploratory and confirmatory factor analysis, is that it provides a granular look at item-construct relationships, without falling into traps earlier burnout researchers fell into.

Liu and van Liew wrote that "the term burnout is used so frequently that it has lost much of its original meaning. As originally used, burnout meant a mild degree of stress-induced unhappiness. The solutions ranged from a vacation to a sabbatical. Ultimately, it was used to describe everything from fatigue to a major depression and now seems to have become an alternative word for depression, but with a less serious significance" (p. 434). The authors equate burnout with adjustment disorder with depressed mood.

Kakiashvili et al., however, argued that although burnout and depression have overlapping symptoms, endocrine evidence suggests that the disorders' biological bases are different. They argued that antidepressants should not be used by people with burnout because the medications can make the underlying hypothalamic–pituitary–adrenal axis dysfunction worse.

Despite its name, depression with atypical features, which is seen in the above table, is not a rare form of depression. The cortisol profile in atypical depression, in contrast to that of melancholic depression, is similar to the cortisol profile found in burnout. Commentators advanced the view that burnout differs from depression because the cortisol profile of burnout differs from that of melancholic depression; however, as the above table indicates, burnout's cortisol profile is similar to that of atypical depression.

It has previously been hypothesised that Chronic Fatigue Syndrome (CFS), also known as Myalgic Encephalomyelitis (ME), is caused by burnout. It is suggested that the "burning out" of the body's stress symptom (by any of a wide range of causes) can lead to chronic fatigue. However, the very nomenclature of "Chronic Fatigue Syndrome" is viewed as problematic by both patients and healthcare professionals specialising in the condition, as it fails to encompass the wide range of non-fatigue related symptoms present in ME/CFS, or to differentiate between the so-named condition and the symptom of chronic fatigue which is present in many unrelated conditions or diseases. Furthermore, more up-to-date research has shown that ME/CFS is a multi-systemic condition that is not psychological in etiology and so comparison to occupational burnout is now less prudent.

Overtraining syndrome is also known as "chronic fatigue," "burnout" and "overstress" in athletes. It has been conceptualised as adjustment disorder, a common diagnosis for those burnt out.

Recovering alcoholics often have a blunted cortisol response to stress, as do some cancer patients and survivors. This symptom is a particular feature of people suffering burnout. Altered cortisol response is experienced by up to 80% of people with depression.

Risk factors
Evidence suggests that the etiology of burnout is multifactorial, with personality factors playing an important, long-overlooked role. Cognitive dispositional factors implicated in depression have also been found to be implicated in burnout. One cause of burnout includes stressors that a person is unable to cope with fully.

Burnout is thought to occur when a mismatch is present between the nature of the job and the job the person is actually doing. A common indication of this mismatch is work overload, which sometimes involves a worker who survives a round of layoffs, but after the layoffs the worker finds that he or she is doing too much with too few resources. Overload may occur in the context of downsizing, which often does not narrow an organization's goals, but requires fewer employees to meet those goals. The research on downsizing, however, indicates that downsizing has more destructive effects on the health of the workers who survive the layoffs than mere burnout; these health effects include increased levels of sickness and greater risk of mortality.

The job demands-resources model has implications for burnout, as measured by the Oldenburg Burnout Inventory (OLBI). Physical and psychological job demands were concurrently associated with the exhaustion, as measured by the OLBI. Lack of job resources was associated with the disengagement component of the OLBI.

Maslach, Schaufeli and Leiter identified six risk factors for burnout in 2001: mismatch in workload, mismatch in control, lack of appropriate awards, loss of a sense of positive connection with others in the workplace, perceived lack of fairness, and conflict between values.

Although job stress has long been viewed as the main determinant of burnout, recent meta-analytic findings indicate that job stress is a weak predictor of burnout. These findings question one of the most central assumptions of burnout research.

In a systematic literature review in 2014, the Swedish Agency for Health Technology Assessment and Assessment of Social Services (SBU) found that a number of work environment factors could affect the risk of developing exhaustion disorder or depressive symptoms:

 People who experience a work situation with little opportunity to influence, in combination with too high demands, develop more depressive symptoms. 
 People who experience a lack of compassionate support in the work environment develop more symptoms of depression and exhaustion disorder than others. Those who experience bullying or conflict in their work develop more depressive symptoms than others, but it is not possible to determine whether there is a corresponding connection for symptoms of exhaustion disorder. 
 People who feel that they have urgent work or a work situation where the reward is perceived as small in relation to the effort develops more symptoms of depression and exhaustion disorder than others. This also applies to those who experience insecurity in the employment, for example concerns that the workplace will be closed down. 
 In some work environments, people have less trouble. People who experience good opportunities for control in their own work and those who feel that they are treated fairly develop less symptoms of depression and exhaustion disorder than others. 
 Women and men with similar working conditions develop symptoms of depression as much as exhaustion disorder.

Negative consequences of burnout on both the employee and the organization call for preventive measures in order to reduce the impact of the risk factors. Burnout prevention strategies, either addressing to the general working population (primary prevention) or the occupational groups which are more vulnerable (secondary prevention), are focused on reducing the impact of risk factors. Reviews of healthcare professionals‟ burnout focusing on identifying risk factors have been conducted previously.

Effects 
Some research indicates that burnout is associated with reduced job performance, coronary heart disease, and mental health problems. Examples of emotional symptoms of occupational burnout include a lack of interest in the work being done, a decrease in work performance levels, feelings of helplessness, and trouble sleeping. With regard to mental health problems, research on dentists and physicians suggests that what is meant by burnout is a depressive syndrome. Thus reduced job performance and cardiovascular risk could be related to burnout because of burnout's tie to depression. Behavioral signs of occupational burnout are demonstrated through cynicism within workplace relationships with coworkers, clients, and the organization itself.

Other effects of burnout can manifest as lower energy and productivity levels, with workers observed to be consistently late for work and feeling a sense of dread upon arriving. They can suffer concentration problems, forgetfulness, increased frustration, and/or feelings of being overwhelmed. They may complain and feel negative, or feel apathetic and believe they have little impact on their coworkers and environment. Occupational burnout is also associated with absenteeism, other time missed from work, and thoughts of quitting.

Chronic burnout is also associated with cognitive impairments in memory and attention. (See also Effects of stress on memory.)

Research suggests that burnout can manifest differently between genders, with higher levels of depersonalisation among men and increased emotional exhaustion among women. Other research suggests that people revealing a history of occupational burnout face future hiring discrimination.

When it happens in the context of volunteering, burnout can often lead to volunteers significantly reducing their activities or stopping volunteering altogether. Likewise, academic stress, as it has been called, or academic burnout is a process originated from the inciting element, which implies the subjection to events that from the student's perspective can be considered as stressors.

Burnout might result in learned helplessness.

Burnout has been found to be associated with spiritual health.

Stages 
Drozdstoj Stoyanov et al. believe burnout has three stages:

 Flame out - trying to deal with excessive stress, causing depression and anxiety.
 Genuine burn out - a process of increasing emotional exhaustion.
 Rust out - being completely alienated from other people, cynical and ineffective.

Treatment and prevention
Health condition treatment and prevention methods are often classified as "primary prevention" (stopping the condition occurring), "secondary prevention" (removing the condition that has occurred) and "tertiary prevention" (helping people live with the condition).  
In addition to interventions that can address and improve conditions on the work side of work-life balance, the ways in which people spend their non-work time can help to prevent burnout and improve health and well-being.

Primary prevention

Maslach believes that the only way to truly prevent burnout is through a combination of organizational change and education for the individual.

Maslach and Leiter postulated that burnout occurs when there is a disconnection between the organization and the individual with regard to what they called the six areas of worklife: workload, control, reward, community, fairness, and values. Resolving these discrepancies requires integrated action on the part of both the individual and the organization. With regard to workload, assuring that a worker has adequate resources to meet demands as well as ensuring a satisfactory work–life balance could help revitalize employees' energy. With regard to values, clearly stated ethical organizational values are important for ensuring employee commitment. Supportive leadership and relationships with colleagues are also helpful.

One approach for addressing these discrepancies focuses specifically on the fairness area. In one study employees met weekly to discuss and attempt to resolve perceived inequities in their job. The intervention was associated with decreases in exhaustion over time but not cynicism or inefficacy, suggesting that a broader approach is required.

Hätinen et al. suggest "improving job-person fit by focusing attention on the relationship between the person and the job situation, rather than either of these in isolation, seems to be the most promising way of dealing with burnout." They also note that "at the individual level, cognitive-behavioural strategies have the best potential for success."

Burnout prevention programs have traditionally focused on cognitive-behavioral therapy (CBT), cognitive restructuring, didactic stress management, and relaxation. CBT, relaxation techniques (including physical techniques and mental techniques), and schedule changes are the best-supported techniques for reducing or preventing burnout in a health-care setting. Mindfulness therapy has been shown to be an effective preventative for occupational burnout in medical practitioners. Combining both organizational and individual-level activities may be the most beneficial approach to reducing symptoms. A Cochrane review, however, reported that evidence for the efficacy of CBT in healthcare workers is of low quality, indicating that it is no better than alternative interventions.

For the purpose of preventing occupational burnout, various stress management interventions have been shown to help improve employee health and well-being in the workplace and lower stress levels. Training employees in ways to manage stress in the workplace have also been shown to be effective in preventing burnout. One study suggests that social-cognitive processes such as commitment to work, self-efficacy, learned resourcefulness, and hope may insulate individuals from experiencing occupational burnout. Increasing a worker's control over his or her job is another intervention has been shown to help counteract exhaustion and cynicism in the workplace.

Additional prevention methods include: starting the day with a relaxing ritual; yoga; adopting healthy eating, exercising, and sleeping habits; setting boundaries; taking breaks from technology; nourishing one's creative side, and learning how to manage stress.

Barry A. Farber suggests strategies like setting more achievable goals, focusing on the value of the work, and finding better ways of doing the job, can all be helpful ways of helping the stressed. People who don't mind the stress but want more reward can benefit from reassessing their work–life balance and implementing stress reduction techniques like meditation and exercise. Others with low stress, but are underwhelmed and bored with work, can benefit from seeking greater challenge.

In one trial, workers taking a high-dose Vitamin B complex "reported significantly lower personal strain and a reduction in confusion and depressed/dejected mood after 12 weeks."

In another trial, doctors undertaking a program involving "mindfulness, reflection, shared experience, and small-group learning" for 9 months had a much lessened propensity to burn out. Another trial with medical interns found a ten-week mindfulness program reduced the incidence of burnout.

Secondary and tertiary prevention (aka treatment and management)

Hätinen et al. list a number of common treatments, including treatment of any outstanding medical conditions, stress management, time management, depression treatment, psychotherapies, ergonomic improvement and other physiological and occupational therapy, physical exercise and relaxation. They have found that is more effective to have a greater focus on "group discussions on work related issues", and discussion about "work and private life interface" and other personal needs with psychologists and workplace representatives.

Jac JL van der Klink and Frank JH van Dijk suggest stress inoculation training, cognitive restructuring, graded activity and "time contingency" (progressing based on a timeline rather than patient's comfort) are effective methods of treatment.

Kakiashvili et al. said that "medical treatment of burnout is mostly symptomatic: it involves measures to prevent and treat the symptoms." They say the use of anxiolytics and sedatives to treat burnout related stress is effective, but does nothing to change the sources of stress. They say the poor sleep often caused by burnout (and the subsequent fatigue) is best treated with hypnotics and CBT (within which they include "sleep hygiene, education, relaxation training, stimulus control, and cognitive therapy"). They advise against the use of antidepressants as they worsen the hypothalamic–pituitary–adrenal axis dysfunction at the core of burnout. They also believe "vitamins and minerals are crucial in addressing adrenal and HPA axis dysfunction," noting the importance of specific nutrients. Omega-3 fatty acids may be helpful. DHA supplementation may also be useful for moderating norepinephrine. 11 beta-hydroxysteroid dehydrogenase (and potentially other metabolites of liquorice root extract) may help with lowered cortisol response.

Salomonsson et al. found that for workers with exhaustion disorder, CBT was better than a Return to Work Intervention (RTW-I) for reducing stress; and that people whose symptoms were primarily depression, anxiety or insomnia had reduced total time away from work after a RTW-I than for CBT.

Ybe Meesters found that light therapy (similar to that used for Seasonal Affective Disorder) may be effective.

Gordon Parker et al. found that the most useful treatment strategies appear to be talking to someone and seeking support, walking or other exercise, mindfulness and meditation, improving sleep, and leaving work completely or taking time off work.

Korczac et al. in a 2012 literature review found that "only for cognitive behavioural therapy (CBT) exists an adequate number of studies which prove its efficacy."

Ahola et al. in a 2014 literature review found that less than 1% of 4430 papers reviewed contained scientifically rigorous data, and that the 14 well-designed studies collectively "showed that such [randomised control trial] interventions did not succeed in alleviating burnout symptoms."

Lindsäter et al. in a 2022 literature review note the reported success of CBT, acceptance and commitment therapy (ACT), a multimodal rehabilitation program (MMR) program (involving group CBT, applied relaxation in a group, individual psychotherapy, physiotherapy, lectures, and medical treatment), physical exercise, cognitive training, consuming rhodiola rosea extract, and participating in an African dance program. However, overall they noted that "a multitude of interventions have been investigated for exhaustion disorder, but the evidence for any one type of intervention is limited."

Burnout also often causes a decline in the ability to update information in working memory. This is not easily treated with CBT.

One reason it is difficult to treat the three standard symptoms of burnout (exhaustion, cynicism, and inefficacy), is because they respond to the same preventive or treatment activities in different ways.

Exhaustion is more easily treated than cynicism and professional inefficacy, which tend to be more resistant to treatment. Research suggests that intervention actually may worsen the professional efficacy of a person who originally exhibited low professional efficacy.

Employee rehabilitation is a tertiary preventive intervention which means the strategies used in rehabilitation are meant to alleviate burnout symptoms in individuals who are already affected without curing them. Such rehabilitation of the working population includes multidisciplinary activities with the intent of maintaining and improving employees' working ability and ensuring a supply of skilled and capable labour in society.

See also 

 Motivational crowding
 Compassion fatigue
 Counterproductive work behavior
 Emotional exhaustion
 Employee engagement
 Meditation
 Spoon theory
 Writer's block
 Workaholism
 Karoshi

Stress and the workplace
 Caregiver stress
 Industrial and organizational psychology 
 Occupational health psychology 
 Occupational Health Science
 Perceived organizational support 
 Perceived psychological contract violation
 Workplace stress
 Teacher burnout

Medical
 Acute stress disorder
 Adjustment disorder
 Chronic fatigue syndrome
 Depression
 Hypothalamic–pituitary–adrenal axis
 Mental disorder
 Pathological demand avoidance
 Posttraumatic stress disorder
 Stress

Notes

References

Further reading

External links 

Human resource management
Occupational stress
Organizational theory
Motivation
Organizational behavior